Ginger is an Indian midscale brand of hotel chain from Indian Hotels Company Limited (IHCL), a subsidiary of the Tata Group. IHCL operates around 85 hotels in 39 cities across India under the Ginger brand.

History 

The first hotel was opened in Whitefield, Bangalore in June 2004.

In March 2013, Ginger Hotels opened its 27th location. In 2014, the group announced its plan to double the number of its locations to reach 50 hotels.

In 2018, IHCL announced its plan to double the number of Ginger Hotels to reach 100 hotels, and rolled out a new branding across its existing locations. The hotels' modernized design was first introduced at the Goa location.

In 2019, IHCL engaged in an asset-light strategy and announced it would sell and lease-back 5 to 10 Ginger Hotels locations.

Description 

Roots Corporation Limited is a subsidiary of the Indian Hotels Company Limited (IHCL), part of the Tata Group. It is India's largest hotel chain with more than 70 properties in India and abroad.

See also 
 Indian Hotels Company Limited
 Tata Group

References

External links
 Ginger Homepage

Companies based in Mumbai
Taj Hotels Resorts and Palaces
Hotels established in 2004
Hotel chains in India
Indian companies established in 2004
2004 establishments in Maharashtra